The commemorative coins of Latvia are issued by the National Bank of Latvia, headquartered in Riga, Latvia, but minted outside Latvia by:
 Rahapaja Oy (Mint of Finland): 3 + 26 coins
 Valcambi sa (Switzerland): 14 coins
 Royal Mint: 12 coins
 Royal Dutch Mint: 6 coins
 Austrian Mint: 5 coins
 Berlin Mint 3 coins
 Paris Mint: 1 coin

Commemorative circulation coins issued in 1993

Commemorative coins issued in 1995-2013

Sources
 

Currencies of Europe
Latvia
Latvia history-related lists